Viktor Kožený (born 28 June 1963 in Prague, Czechoslovakia) is a fugitive financier. 

According to Bloomberg News, he graduated from Harvard in 1989 with a bachelor's degree in economics. However, he cannot be located in the Harvard Alumni directory as of 2015. Viktor Kožený is an Irish citizen imprisoned in the Bahamas in 2005 but released in 2007. He currently lives in a gated community in the Bahamas. Efforts to bring him to justice stem from both the Czech Republic and the USA. An international warrant has been issued for Kožený, who in the early 1990s ran one of the great scams of the post-Communist era. By the media he is often called "the pirate of Prague".

He was imprisoned after a US extradition request, but that was refused by Bahaman authorities in October 2007.

In February 2008 a court case against him and his partner Boris Vostrý started at Prague Municipal Court. Kožený has remained in the Bahamas and has not been attending the trial. He asked the prosecution to publish the charges on the Internet, which the state prosecutor has refused to do. His defense counsel later published the indictment upon order from Kožený.

In 2010, Kožený was convicted of fraud by a Czech court and sentenced to 10 years imprisonment and ordered to pay damages equal to hundreds of millions in USD. In 2012, the judgment was reaffirmed by the High Court in Prague with minor changes. An enforcement action based on this judgement has been lodged by the fraud victim in New York, targeting assets frozen by US authorities. The defendant in the case is a company owned beneficially by Kožený's mother, Jitka Chvatik. Assets of the company have been refrozen by the court after the company lost an appeal in 2014. The case is still pending.

As of January 2019, Kožený is still internationally wanted by the Czech and US criminal justice. He is effectively confined to The Bahamas, holding his Irish passport.

Czech voucher privatization 

During the voucher privatization, Czech state assets were supposed to be handed over to Czech citizens through a system of vouchers, which could then be used to buy shares in companies. However mutual funds were founded, most successfully the one started by Kožený, Harvard Capital and Consulting (which has no affiliation with Harvard University).

Soon thousands of Czechs were signing over their voucher books to "Harvard", who promised a 1000% rate of return on investment. Harvard Funds bought shares in a number of companies, stripped assets and transferred the money abroad to offshore tax havens like the Bahamas. This scam turned out to be a huge success for Kožený and those working with him, who allegedly stole millions of dollars from investors in his funds.

Azerbaijan scam 

In 1994, Kožený wanted to conduct a similar transaction in Azerbaijan.  The country was considering privatizing its state run oil company SOCAR, and Kožený offered his services. U.S. investors handed their money to him, over $400 million in total from clients such as AIG and Columbia University. The Azerbaijan government changed its mind on privatization, but Kožený did not return the money and instead ran to the Bahamas. Viktor Kožený in an exclusive interview with Mirza Khazar of the RFE/RL Azerbaijani Service on 17 July 2001 urged then Azerbaijani President Heidar Aliev to fulfill his promises made in 1997–1998 concerning the privatization program in his country. According to Kožený, Heydar Aliyev and his son and current president, Ilham Aliyev, personally met with him and other members of Kožený's investors group in Baku and encouraged them to buy vouchers from citizens. Shortly after the first part of the interview with Viktor Kožený was aired, the newspaper "Alternativ," with close ties to the Azerbaijan President's Office, reacted promptly, claiming that President Aliev or his son Ilham never met with Kožený. The paper admitted Kožený may have been tricked by some officials, but rejected his claim that President Aliev made any commitments to his group. Kožený faced a serious legal action by famed Manhattan District Attorney Robert Morgenthau, who had filed an indictment in New York for his bribery of Azeri officials.

His trial for the scam began on 1 June 2010.

The Bahamian authorities later refused to turn Kožený over to the US authorities upon a 2012 ruling of the Privy Council which stated the offence was not an extraditable one.

However Kožený's partner, Frederic Bourke, appeared in a US court in 2009. The court accepted it to be proven that Kožený and his entourage bribed the President of Azerbaijan Heydar Aliev, his son Ilham Aliyev, and two other high-ranking Azerbaijani officials. According to the indictment, the total amount of bribes reached USD 11 million.

See also

List of fugitives from justice who disappeared

References

External links
 Official site of Harvard industrial holdings 
 Official site of Ochranné Sdružení Malých Akcionářů

1963 births
Fugitive financiers
Fugitives wanted by the Czech Republic
Fugitives wanted by the United States
Fugitives wanted on fraud charges
Harvard University alumni
Irish people imprisoned abroad
Irish people of Czech descent
Irish expatriates in the Bahamas
Living people
Naturalised citizens of Ireland
Prisoners and detainees of the Bahamas